Two Years Ago

"Two Years Ago" by Ellie Goulding Composed by Ellie Goulding / Jim Eliot
"Two Years Ago" by Norman Cook / Paul Oakenfold Composed by Norman Cook
"Two Years Ago" by Nelo (band)